Lödla is a municipality in the district Altenburger Land, in Thuringia, Germany.

References

Altenburger Land
Duchy of Saxe-Altenburg